The High Peak by-election was held on 16 March 1961.  It was held due to the incumbent Conservative, Hugh Molson, being granted a Life Peerage.  It was won by the Conservative David Walder.

Candidates
The local Liberal association selected 31-year-old Dennis Wrigley as their candidate. He was an architect. He was educated at Manchester Grammar School and Manchester Regional School of Architecture. He was President of the Lancashire, Cheshire and North Western Young Liberal Federation. He had contested Oldham East at the 1959 general election where he polled 15% of the vote and came third.

Result

References

By-elections to the Parliament of the United Kingdom in Derbyshire constituencies
High Peak by-election
High Peak by-election
1960s in Derbyshire
High Peak by-election